Agassiz's anole (Anolis agassizi) is a species of lizard in the family Dactyloidae. The species is endemic to Malpelo Island, which is part of Colombia.

Etymology
The specific name, agassizi, is in honour of Alexander Agassiz, who was an American zoologist and mining engineer.

Habitat

Description
Males of A. agassizi grow to  snout-to-vent length (SVL), while females may reach  SVL. The females and some of the males have spotted heads and grey-brown colouration. The remainder of the males have black nuptial crests, grow larger, and have larger testes. The reason for this is unknown, but may be related to the reduced predation on larger males.

Ecology
Anolis agassizi is less territorial than other anoles, sharing perches and food sources without dispute. Their territories often overlap. Malpelo Island is quite barren of vegetation, and the anoles mainly eat insects, especially beetles. Based on an attraction to the colour orange, they may also eat bird eggs, as large numbers of boobies nest on the island. Their main predator is Diploglossus millepunctatus.

Reproduction
A. agassizi is oviparous.

References

Further reading
Stejneger L (1900). "Descriptions of two New Lizards of the genus Anolis from Cocos and Malpelo Islands". Bulletin of the Museum of Comparative Zoölogy at Harvard College 36 (6): 161-164 + one plate. (Anolis agassizi, new species, pp. 161–163).

Anoles
Lizards of South America
Endemic fauna of Colombia
Reptiles of Colombia
Reptiles described in 1900
Taxa named by Leonhard Stejneger